Edgar Allan Poe Award for Best Play:

Winners

1950-1999

2000-2012

See also 
 Edgar Award
 Mystery Writers of America
 :Category:Edgar Award winners
 :Category:Edgar Award winning works

References

External links
 The official website of Edgar Awards

Lists of writers by award
Mystery and detective fiction awards
English-language literary awards